Meliochamus is a genus of beetle in the family Cerambycidae.

Species

References

Lamiini
Cerambycidae genera